Angel Peña may refer to:

 Ángel Peña (baseball) (born 1975), Dominican baseball player
 Ángel Peña (musician) (born 1948), Puerto Rican musician and composer
 Angel Peña Ramírez (born 1978), Puerto Rican politician